Barbara Copping (née Fitzgerald; May 1, 1944) is a Canadian politician, who served as a New Democratic Member of the Legislative Assembly of British Columbia. She represented the riding of Port Moody-Burnaby Mountain from 1991 to 1996.

References

1944 births
British Columbia New Democratic Party MLAs
Living people
Politicians from Vancouver
Women MLAs in British Columbia